Chayah Miranda (born October 6, 1981) is an American Christian musician, who primarily plays an indie pop style of worship music. She has released one studio album, No Other Way in 2016, and an extended play, Alive & Unplugged.

Early and personal life
Chayah Gemora Miranda was born on October 6, 1981 in San Francisco, California, the first child to father Sancho Macaspac Miranda and mother Jean Ezpeleta Miranda (née, Gemora). She has a younger sister, Shahannah, and two younger brothers, Ezra and Caleb.

Music career
Her music recording career began in 2012. Miranda released an extended play, Alive & Unplugged, on June 3, 2014. Her first studio album, No Other Way, was released on May 3, 2016.

Discography
Studio albums
 "No Other Way" (May 3, 2016, independent)

EPs
 Alive & Unplugged (June 3, 2014, independent)

References

External links
 Official website

1981 births
Living people
American performers of Christian music
Musicians from San Francisco
Songwriters from California